Lubersac is a commune in the Corrèze département in central France near Arnac-Pompadour and Uzerche.

Formerly called Louparsat ("lou percé" in Limousin, can be translated to "pierced wolf" in English), named from the legend of a knight who killed a wolf with a blow of his sword to save his beloved.

Geography
The commune is located on the river Auvézère. Lubersac station has rail connections to Brive-la-Gaillarde, Saint-Yrieix and Limoges.

Population
Its inhabitants are called Lubersacois in French.

Personalities
 Joseph, Count Souham (see also Joseph Souham) was born in Lubersac on 30 April 1760. He died on 28 April 1837 at Versailles. He was a French general of the First French Empire.

See also
Communes of the Corrèze department

References

External links

Website of the commune of Lubersac 

Communes of Corrèze
Corrèze communes articles needing translation from French Wikipedia